Susanne E. Aalto (born 28 November 1964) is a Swedish professor of radio astronomy geodesy at the Onsala Space Observatory in the department of Space, Earth and Environment at Chalmers University of Technology. She has been a professor of radio astronomy since 2013. Between 1994 and 1999, she was completed her post doctoral studies at the Steward Observatory, University of Arizona and at Caltech in the United States. 

In 1999, Aalto  was awarded the Albert Wallin Prize by the Royal Society for Science and Knowledge in Gothenburg, Sweden. She researches galaxy evolution and motion using radio telescopes and radiation from molecules.

Early life and education 
Aalto was born on 28 November 1964 in Eskilstuna, Sweden. In 1994, she became Sweden's first female doctor of radio astronomy with a dissertation on radiation from molecules as a way to study galaxies that form many stars simultaneously (starburst galaxies).

References 

Living people
1964 births
Chalmers University of Technology alumni
Academic staff of the Chalmers University of Technology
Women astronomers
21st-century Swedish astronomers
Members of the Royal Swedish Academy of Sciences